Carlos Souto Vidal (born 4 November 1976) is a Spanish rugby union player. He played as a flanker. His twin brother, Sergio Souto was also a Spanish international.

Career
His first international cap was on December 2 1998, against Portugal at Murrayfield. He played all the three matches for Spain at the 1999 Rugby World Cup. His last cap was at the match against Romania on March 27 2010, at Bucharest.

Personal life
He works as an officer for the Civil Guard. His twin brother, Sergio was also a rugby union player and both played for Spain at the 1999 Rugby World Cup, Spain's only appearance in a Rugby World Cup to date.

External links
Carlos Souto International Statistics
 
 
 

1976 births
Living people
Sportspeople from Oviedo
Spanish rugby union players
Rugby union flankers
Spain international rugby union players
Twin sportspeople